Nulles is a municipality in the comarca of Alt Camp, Tarragona, Catalonia, Spain.

The old winery of Nulles, also known in Catalonia as one of the Wine Cathedrals, was built in Modernisme and Noucentisme, designed by architect Cèsar Martinell.

References

External links
 Government data pages 

Municipalities in Alt Camp
Populated places in Alt Camp